The Vickers Petroleum Service Station is a historic building constructed in 1954 in Haysville, Kansas. It was the first service station to feature a hyperbolic paraboloid form, also known as a "batwing",  developed by John M. Hickman and was placed on the National Register of Historic Places September 30, 2019 

Haysville's Chamber of Commerce has used the building as an office since the interior was remodeled in 2007.

See also
National Register of Historic Places listings in Sedgwick County, Kansas

References

Commercial buildings on the National Register of Historic Places in Kansas
National Register of Historic Places in Wichita, Kansas